Holmgren Pines Ecological Reserve is an ecological reserve located south of Moose Lake Provincial Park, Manitoba, Canada. It was established in 2013 under the Manitoba Ecological Reserves Act.

See also
 List of ecological reserves in Manitoba
 List of protected areas of Manitoba

References

External links
 iNaturalist: Holmgren Pines Ecological Reserve

Protected areas established in 2013
Ecological reserves of Manitoba
Nature reserves in Manitoba
Protected areas of Manitoba